Oleksandr Hranovskyi (born 11 March 1976) is a retired professional Ukrainian football international defender.

Career
He joined Kryvbas in 1998. Hranovskyi captained Kryvbas 19 times. He was the finalist of Ukrainian Championship in 2000. He also participated 23 times in the Ukrainian Cup and 6 times in the UEFA Europa League.

External links

 Official Website Profile
 

1976 births
Living people
Sportspeople from Cherkasy
Ukrainian footballers
Ukraine international footballers
Ukrainian expatriate footballers
Expatriate footballers in Moldova
Ukrainian expatriate sportspeople in Moldova
Expatriate footballers in Russia
Ukrainian expatriate sportspeople in Russia
Expatriate footballers in the Czech Republic
Ukrainian expatriate sportspeople in the Czech Republic
FC Dnipro Cherkasy players
FC Kryvbas Kryvyi Rih players
FC Spartak Moscow players
Russian Premier League players
FC Karpaty Lviv players
FC Rubin Kazan players
FC Metalist Kharkiv players
FC Kharkiv players
FC Nyva Vinnytsia players
Association football defenders
Ukrainian football managers
FC Chornomorets Odesa managers
Ukrainian Premier League managers
Ukrainian expatriate football managers
Expatriate football managers in Belarus
Ukrainian expatriate sportspeople in Belarus